Robert Boyde Gartrell (born 9 March 1962), is a former Australian cricketer who played first-class cricket for Tasmania and Western Australia from 1984 to 1987. He also represented Western Australia in List A cricket on three occasions.

Gartrell was born in Middle Swan, Western Australia.  He was a left-handed batsman, and made one first-class century in his career.

References

External links
 

1946 births
Tasmania cricketers
Australian cricketers
Living people
Cricketers from Perth, Western Australia
Sportsmen from Western Australia